Events in the year 1984 in Bulgaria.

Incumbents 

 General Secretaries of the Bulgarian Communist Party: Todor Zhivkov
 Chairmen of the Council of Ministers: Grisha Filipov

Events

Sports 

 The 6th World Sports Acrobatics Championships were held in Sofia, Bulgaria.

References 

 
1980s in Bulgaria
Years of the 20th century in Bulgaria
Bulgaria
Bulgaria